Yongmudo, Yongmoodo or Yong Moo Do is a modern hybrid Korean martial art which combines different techniques from taekwondo, hapkido, judo, and ssireum as well as boxing and wrestling.

History 

Yongmudo was developed at Yong-In University and has been practiced at this university as a self-defense art since 1953. The Martial Arts College of Yong-In University formally announced the creation of a new discipline, known as Yongmoodo on October 15, 1998.

The Self-Defense Yongmudo Club was formed in 1974 and the World Yongmudo Federation was established in 1999.

Norman Link believes that yongmudo "was developed in part because as taekwondo grew into a dazzling martial sport, it lost most of the other aspects, like self-defense."

Etymology
The term Yongmoodo (literally translated as "Dragon Martial Way") comes from the word Hankido which was developed in Korea in 1976. Then the name changed to Kukmodo and then changed to Yongmoodo. Yongmoodo consists of three syllables: 1. YONG means dragon. 2. MU or MOO means martial which refers to fighting or battles and fights including defense and strategic, physical, mental, and physiology aspects. 3. DO means a way of training and a way of life and contains philosophy and the ability to learn from nature, live and fight, against nature.

Features
Yongmudo uses various dynamic techniques from martial arts such as Taekwondo, Judo, and Ssirum and is based on physical, psychological, spiritual, and mental training with contemporary scientific knowledge. Yongmudo was developed with an emphasis on education, training and martial arts philosophy. It is a practical self-defense training system, combining most practical techniques from several traditional Korean martial arts as well as other related disciplines. The primary techniques of Yongmoodo including offensive and defensive techniques are throwing, grappling and ground techniques from Judo, slamming and holding down from Wrestling, kicking, striking, thrusting, punching and blocking from Taekwondo, Kumdo and Kerkki, and joint locking from Hapkido.

Scientific study
A study about the effects of yongmoodo exercises confirmed that "the functional balance mat for Yongmoodo exercise program could improve the posture alignment pursuant and gait abilities of body imbalance of obese elementary students." Another study concluded that the high intensity yongmudo training could improve the maximum muscle strength of adult males.
A study about the turning kicks in Taekwondo and Yongmudo reached the conclusion that the turning kick was performed quicker by the Taekwondo players.

By country

Australia
The Yongmoodo Australia Association (YAA) and the Yongmoodo Oceania Association (YOA), founded by In Cheol Yoo (a graduate of Yong-In University), were established to formally support the objectives of Yong-In University's aim to develop and promote Yongmoodo in the world.

India
Indian Yongmudo Federation is the current governing body for Yongmudo in India. Indian Yongmudo Federation has subsequently created Indian Yongmudo Committee to manage and spread Yongmudo all over India. Indian Yongmudo Federation is also affiliated in School Games Federation Of India(SGFI). Yongmudo in India was founded by Rohit Narkar. Narkar is currently the President of Indian Yongmudo Federation.

Indonesia
Yongmudo is currently used extensively in military training in Indonesia. This sport has officially become a mandatory sport among the Indonesian Army since 2008.

Iran
Keyvan Dehnad is the founder and president of Iran Yongmudo Association (the current governing body for Yongmudo in Iran and the official national organization for the promotion of Yongmudo). Iran Yongmudo has been recognized by ministry of sport and Iran Martial Arts Federation and Member of International Yongmudo Federation. Amir Sheikh Hosseini won a gold medal and Reza Goodary won a silver medal in 2nd International Yongmudo Championships in 2016. Amir Sheikh Hosseini won a gold medal and Reza Goodary won a bronze medal in 2016 World Martial Arts Masterships. Iranian athletes won a gold medal Arya Sheikh Hosseini and a bronze medal Reza Goodary in 2019 World Martial Arts Masterships.

Malaysia
S. Suhaizy is the president of Malaysian Yongmudo Association. It was established in 2009.

Mongolia
In 2019 Chungju World Martial Arts Masterships, D. Tserendorj and Ts. Odbayar finished 3rd place (bronze medal) and 5th place respectively.

South Korea
Kang Minchul is the manager of the Korean Yongmudo Association (KYA) and professor in the Department of Oriental Martial Arts at Yong In University. KYA is the headquarters and office of South Korea Yongmudo at Yong In University.

United States
Yongmudo is practiced in University of California Martial Arts Program. The US Yongmudo Association is the official national organization for the promotion of Yongmudo in the US. Russell Ahn is the current US Yongmudo Association President and Deputy Secretary General of the International Yongmudo Federation.

World Martial Arts Masterships Result

2019

See also 

World Martial Arts Masterships
2016 Pekan Olahraga Nasional
 Jujutsu

References

External links 

 International Yongmudo Federation
 
 Cal Yongmudo Club

Combat sports
Games and sports introduced in 1953
Korean culture
Korean martial arts
Mixed martial arts styles
Sports originating in Korea
Hybrid martial arts
Yongmudo